Military Museum may refer to museums of military and war, or specific museums including:

 Aldershot Military Museum, in Aldershot, England
 Athens War Museum, in Athens, Greece
 Base Borden Military Museum, Borden, Ontario, Canada
 California State Military Museum, California, United States
 Diefenbunker, Ottawa, Ontario, Canada
 Elgin Military Museum, St. Thomas, Ontario, Canada
 Holy Defense Museum, Tehran, Iran
 Istanbul Military Museum, Istanbul, Turkey
 Keep Military Museum, Dorchester, England
 Kohima Museum, a museum in York, England
 Military Museum (Belgrade), a museum in Belgrade
 Military Museum of the Chinese People's Revolution, in Beijing, People's Republic of China
 Military Museum of Finland, Helsinki, Finland
 Military Museum Station, station at Line 1, Beijing Subway
 The Military Museums, museum in Alberta, Canada
 Military museums in Denmark
 Minnesota Military Museum, Camp Ripley, Little Falls, Minnesota, United States
 Museum for the Macedonian Struggle (Thessaloniki), in Thessaloniki, Greece
 Museum of the Macedonian Struggle (Kastoria), in Kastoria, Greece
 Pavlos Melas Museum, in Melas, Greece
 Republic of China Air Force Museum, a museum in Kaohsiung, Taiwan
 Republic of China Armed Forces Museum, a museum in Taipei, Taiwan
 Staffordshire Regiment Museum, Staffordshire, United Kingdom
 The Defence- and Garrison Museum, in Aalborg, Denmark
 Liberation War Museum, a museum in Dhaka, Bangladesh
 The Queen's Own Cameron Highlanders of Canada Museum, in Winnipeg, Canada
 Satriamandala Museum, in South Jakarta, Indonesia
 South African National Museum of Military History in Johannesburg, South Africa

See also
 Military and war museums

Military